In mathematics, Ferrers functions are certain special functions defined in terms of hypergeometric functions.
They are named after Norman Macleod Ferrers.

Definitions 
When the order μ and the degree ν are real and x ∈ (-1,1)
Ferrers function of the first kind

 

Ferrers function of the second kind

See also 
 Legendre function

References

Special functions